The Hunter 333 is an American sailboat that was first built in 1988.

Production
The design was built by Hunter Marine in the United States, but it is now out of production.

Design
The Hunter 333 is a recreational keelboat, built predominantly of fiberglass. It has a fractional sloop B&R rig, a raked stem, a reverse transom, an internally-mounted spade-type rudder controlled by a wheel and a fixed fin keel. It displaces  and carries  of ballast.

The boat is fitted with a Japanese Yanmar diesel engine.

See also
List of sailing boat types

Related development
Hunter 33.5
Moorings 335

Similar sailboats
Abbott 33
C&C 3/4 Ton
C&C 33
C&C 101
C&C SR 33
CS 33
Endeavour 33
Hunter 33
Hunter 33-2004
Hunter 340
Marlow-Hunter 33
Mirage 33
Nonsuch 33
Tanzer 10
Viking 33

References

External links
Official brochure

Keelboats
1980s sailboat type designs
Sailing yachts
Sailboat types built by Hunter Marine